Daniel Dodd Wilson is an American musician, singer, songwriter and record producer. His songwriting  résumé  includes "Closing Time", which he wrote for his band, Semisonic; "Not Ready to Make Nice", co-written with The Chicks; and "Someone Like You", co-written with Adele. He earned a Grammy nomination for "Closing Time" (Best Rock Song) and won Grammys for Song of the Year ("Not Ready to Make Nice" in 2007) and Album of the Year (which he won in 2012 as one of the producers of Adele's 21).

In addition to being the leader of Semisonic, Wilson has released several solo recordings, including the 2017 release Re-Covered. He was also a member of the Minneapolis psychedelic rock band Trip Shakespeare.

Early life and education
Wilson is a native of St. Louis Park, Minnesota. Wilson attended Harvard University, where he studied visual arts with a focus on printmaking and from which he graduated B.A. summa cum laude in Visual and Environmental Studies in 1983, while he resided in Dunster House. Wilson is an accomplished artist, and won the first Louis Sudler Prize for Outstanding Artistic Talent and Achievement in 1983. While in college, he began collaborating with his brother, singer-songwriter Matt Wilson, who also attended Harvard College. The Wilson brothers played in two bands, Animal Dance and the Love Monsters. After college, Wilson pursued his interest in drawing and painting, first in San Francisco and then in Minneapolis.

Career

Early career 
In 1987, Wilson joined the Minneapolis psychedelic band, Trip Shakespeare, which Matt Wilson had founded with bassist John Munson and drummer Elaine Harris. The original three members had already released one record, Applehead Man, and now as a quartet, with Wilson on guitar, piano, sharing lead vocal duties with Matt Wilson—with whom Wilson also co-wrote many of the songs—and Munson, the band released three more albums (Are You Shakespearienced?, 1988, Gark Records; Across the Universe, 1990, A&M Records; Lulu, 1991, A&M Records) and one EP (Volt, 1992, Twin Tone).

Since Trip Shakespeare's breakup in 1992, Wilson has continued to collaborate with his brother, including the release of two live albums (Minneapolis 2010 and Minneapolis 2013).

With Semisonic

After Trip Shakespeare's breakup in 1992, Wilson and Munson joined with drummer Jacob Slichter to form Pleasure, a trio that was later renamed Semisonic. Semisonic released one EP, three full-length albums, and one live album.

The band's first album, Great Divide, received critical acclaim. David Fricke wrote in a year-end Rolling Stone article on the notable albums of 1996, "Great Divide is that rare '96 beast, a record of simple but sparkling modern pop, rattling with power-trio vitality." It was their 1998 release, Feeling Strangely Fine, however, that brought the band to widespread national and then international attention and success. Powered by Wilson's songs "Closing Time", which was a number-one hit on the Modern Rock charts for thirteen weeks in the spring and summer of 1998, the follow-up single "Singing in My Sleep", and "Secret Smile", a breakthrough hit for the band internationally, Feeling Strangely Fine attained platinum sales status in the U.S. and U.K. "Closing Time" received a 1999 Grammy nomination for Best Rock Song and has become an enduring pop-culture reference point for the late 1990s. It was a focal point of the plot and soundtrack of the 2011 film Friends with Benefits.

Semisonic's third album, All About Chemistry, was released in 2001, and featured Wilson's song "Chemistry", the album's first single, and also included "One True Love", a song Wilson co-wrote with Carole King.

Semisonic stopped touring in August 2001 but continued to perform on occasion. Slichter's memoir, So You Wanna Be a Rock & Roll Star, provides a detailed account of the band's adventures and misadventures in the music business.

On June 26, 2020, Semisonic released their first single in nearly 20 years titled "You're Not Alone," followed by an EP of the same name on September 18, 2020.

As a solo artist

Free Life
Wilson's solo debut, Free Life, was released in 2007 by American Recordings. Produced with Rick Rubin, Free Life was recorded in Minneapolis and Los Angeles and includes performances by Tracy Bonham, Sheryl Crow, Jason Lader, Gary Louris, Natalie Maines, Benmont Tench, and a number of Minneapolis-based musicians including multi-instrumentalist and frequent Semisonic sideman Ken Chastain, Eric Fawcett, John Hermanson, Joanna James, Mason Jennings, Steve Rhoem, Joe Savage, as well as Wilson's Semisonic bandmates Munson and Slichter.

Free Life helped establish Wilson's reputation as a songwriter, with The A.V. Club writing, "the star of the show here is Wilson's remarkable instinct for creating gorgeous songs, and his unabashed, obvious joy in doing so. For anyone worried that songcraft is an endangered species, Free Life should ease those fears."

The song Breathless became a big hit in Greece (and other Balkan countries) and Dan Wilson performed it at the 2009 MAD Video Music Awards.

Love Without Fear

Wilson's second solo album, Love Without Fear, was released on April 15, 2014 and includes performances by Sara Bareilles, Missy Higgins, Lissie, Natalie Maines, Blake Mills, Sara Watkins, and Sean Watkins. The first recording from Love Without Fear, "Disappearing" (with a cover of Neil Young's "Out on the Weekend" included as a b-side) was released on November 7, 2013 and was the debut release of the new singles label, Canvasclub.

In describing the album, Wilson said, "The songs are about being left alone, not wanting to lose someone, about desperately wishing for connection and togetherness. The sound of the record lives at the intersection of Americana and Beatles- influenced rock and roll. A little bit of twang and a lot of cinematic emotion." The album received largely favourable reviews emphasizing Wilson's reputation as a songwriter. "Dan Wilson's career is proof positive that smart, elegant songwriting has a place in music… [Love Without Fear] is a lovely amalgamation of chamber rock, gentle country, gooey '70s pop and snappy soul."

Re-Covered
Wilson's third solo studio album, Re-Covered, was released on August 4, 2017. The album is a collection of reinterpretations of songs Wilson wrote for other artists, both big hits and "songs that I always wished were big hits, but weren't." The album includes "Someone Like You" (written with Adele), "Not Ready To Make Nice" (written with Dixie Chicks), "Home" (written with Dierks Bentley and Brett Beavers), and "When The Stars Come Out" (written with Chris Stapleton).

Singles
In September 2018 Wilson announced that he would begin releasing new music that Fall. Rather than organizing the new songs into an album, he would instead release them over time as monthly singles. According to Wilson, "I fell in love with the idea of just letting songs out into the world when they happen." "I don't have anything against making an album. If I do 15 or 20 of these I would love the idea of packaging them together and calling it an album. I think that'd be fantastic, but I don't really have that in my mind. I'm just trying to be free."

Words and Music by Dan Wilson
Wilson's discoveries as a solo artist and collaborator with other artists are the subject of "Words and Music by Dan Wilson", solo concerts in which he performs some of his songs and describes the songs' various inspirations or the insights that occasioned their composition. "Words and Music by Dan Wilson" has come to Hotel Cafe, Room 5 and Largo in Los Angeles, Joe's Pub and City Winery in New York, World Cafe Live in Philadelphia, Jammin' Java in DC, Rams Head in Annapolis, The Cedar Cultural Center in Minneapolis, the Fitzgerald Theater in Saint Paul, Schubas Tavern in Chicago, Berklee College of Music's Red Room at Cafe 939 in Boston, and the Red Barn concert series in Northfield, MN. Wilson has also presented Words & Music workshops at the 2012 ASCAP expo, UCLA's Herb Alpert School of Music, and USC's Thornton School of Music.

Wilson's thoughts about songwriting and the creative process are also captured in his series, Words & Music in Six Seconds, which was originally launched on Vine and is now regularly posted on Instagram, Twitter, and Facebook. From American Songwriter, "In his short videos, Wilson provides insightful quips about common songwriting insecurities, methodology, personal writing quirks, and various other tips for writing your best." In November 2020, he released the Words + Music in 6 Seconds deck, a collection of cards written and designed by Wilson based on his Instagram series.

As a songwriter and producer
As a songwriter and producer, Wilson has collaborated with a number of artists. Two of these collaborations have earned him Grammy Awards.

A number of artists have described Wilson's ability to help put their feelings and ideas into song. Speaking of her experience of working with him, Pink said, in an online interview, "He is brilliant, and he's a thoughtful songwriter. And he's a song crafter . . . like old-school. He crafts songs and he thinks about them. And I learned a lot from working with him." In describing her co-writing with Wilson, Adele said, "Dan had me on my hands and knees, crying my eyes out - there's just something about him that made me completely open up as a composer."

Taking the Long Way – The Dixie Chicks
Wilson co-wrote six of the songs on the Dixie Chicks multiple-Grammy-winning album Taking the Long Way, including the title song and "Not Ready to Make Nice", which earned Wilson and the Dixie Chicks the 2007 Grammy for Song of the Year. In the 2006 film Dixie Chicks: Shut Up and Sing, Wilson speaks on camera about his experience as a co-writer on this album, especially in regard to helping the Dixie Chicks make an artistic response to their rejection by radio and a large swath of their fans in the wake of the band's statements about President Bush and the Iraq War.

One of the songs he co-wrote for this album, "Easy Silence", appears on Free Life, with Dixie Chicks singer Natalie Maines singing harmonies.

21 – Adele
Wilson co-wrote three of the songs on Adele's multiple-Grammy-winning 21, "Don't You Remember", "One and Only", and, most notably, "Someone Like You", which became a number one hit in the US, UK, Ireland, Australia, and New Zealand was a top ten hit around the globe. As a producer of this track, on which he also played piano, Wilson shared in the 2012 Grammy Award for Album of the Year.

In an interview with American Songwriter, Wilson recounted the writing and recording of "Someone Like You":

The recording on the album was intended as a demo. I was thinking, "Oh, they're going to make a big version of this, strings and angelic choirs, like a big Chrissie Hynde power-ballad." But by the end of the first day, the demo was sounding lovely, and very affecting, but it was only half-written, there were no words on the second verse or the bridge as I remember. Adele came to the studio the next day and said, "I played it for my manager and me Mum." I was a little nervous about this because I don't like people to hear works-in-progress. I asked her what they thought of the song. "My manager loves it and me Mum cried."

"Someone Like You" won the 2012 Grammy for Best Pop Solo Performance, and as she accepted the award, Adele said, "I want to thank Dan Wilson, who wrote this song with me. My life changed when I wrote this song and I felt it before anyone even heard it."

"Someone Like You" was the most downloaded single of all time in the UK and was voted third most favourite single of the last 60 years in the UK.

As a visual artist
Wilson's career as a painter, illustrator, and calligrapher is less widely known, but his artwork has often intersected with his music career. He was represented by Thomas Barry Fine Arts in Minneapolis, and his works are included in numerous private and corporate collections.

Wilson's paintings are featured on the artwork for two of Trip Shakespeare's albums, Are You Shakespearienced? and Lulu, as well as on the cover of his first solo album, Free Life.

Wilson created all of the artwork for his 2014 album Love Without Fear. Most notably, a hand illustrated 24-page hardcover Deluxe Album Book/CD. The package includes Wilson's own calligraphy, sketches, and handwritten lyrics for each song on the album. The official lyric videos for his singles from the album, "Disappearing" and "A Song Can Be About Anything" are also made entirely from his own illustrations.

At his "Words and Music by Dan Wilson" shows, audience members receive illuminated set lists that are hand illustrated by Wilson. One of these set lists was featured on NPR's blog All Songs Considered.

Wilson's calligraphy and illustrations are featured in his Tumblr series, "DW's Sketchbook" and his musical cartoons have been featured in The Wall Street Journal'''s Speakeasy Blog.

Personal life
Wilson is married to Diane Espaldon. Wilson and his wife were contemporaries at Harvard University, where he studied visual arts and she studied government. Wilson's wife subsequently earned a M.A. from School of International and Public Affairs, Columbia University. Together, they have one biological daughter, Corazon ("Coco") (b. 1997), who was born prematurely and has disabilities and for whom "Closing Time" was written before her birth, and Lily (b. 2007), who was adopted at age two from the Philippines.

Discography

 Singles 
 2022 "Dancing On The Moon" 
 2022 "On The Floor" - Perfume Genius cover
 2021 "Under The Circumstances"
 2020 "Try Love"
 2020 "The Real Question"
 2020 "Red Light"
 2020 "Superfan"
 2020 "Eventually"
 2019 "Last December"
 2019 "Sunshine"
 2019 "Too Much ii"
 2019 "A Modest Proposal"
 2019 "The Rules"
 2019 "Fly Safe"
 2018 "Are You Lonely Tonight, Mrs. Claus?"
 2018 "Christmassy"
 2018 "Uncanny Valley"
 2018 "We Ain't Telling"
 2016 "Yoko"
 2015 "The Hottest Christmas Eve Ever"
 2013 "Disappearing"

 Studio albums 
 2022 Dancing On The Moon EP 2017 Re-Covered 2014 Love Without Fear 2008 Be Free EP digital release
 2007 Free LifeLive albums
2009 Dan Wilson Live at the Pantages – A 2-CD document of Dan Wilson's concert at Minneapolis' Pantages Theater on December 13, 2008.
2008 Live at the Electric Fetus2001 DW Live @ the CCC
1998 Dan Wilson Live @ Bryant Lake Bowlwith Semisonic
2020 You're Not Alone (EP)
2018 Feeling Strangely Fine (20th Anniversary Reissue)
2003 One Night at First Avenue (live)
2001 All About Chemistry1998 Feeling Strangely Fine1996 Great Divide	
1995 Pleasure EP (EP)
1993 PleasureDan and Matt Wilson
2013 Dan & Matt Wilson Minneapolis 2013
2010 Dan & Matt Wilson Minneapolis 2010

Trip Shakespeare
1992 Volt (EP)
1991 Lulu1990 Across the Universe1989 Are You Shakespearienced?1986 Applehead ManThe Love Monsters
1983 Kiss Away The Tears (7")

Film, TV, and Soundtracks (as a performer)
2013 Absolutely Cuckoo: Minnesota Covers the 69 Love Songs – "The Things We Did and Didn't Do"
2011 Minnesota Remembers Vic Chesnutt – "Soft Picasso" 
2010 Dear John Soundtrack – "You Take My Troubles Away" (with Rachael Yamagata)
2009 All About Steve Soundtrack – "Sugar"
2006 For New Orleans – "I Can't Hold You"
2002 For the Kids – "Willie the King"
2002 Maybe This Christmas – "What a Year for a New Year"
2001 Summer Catch Soundtrack – Semisonic's "Over My Head"
1999 American Pie Soundtrack - "Good Morning Baby"
1999 Together in Concert: Live, Bic Runga Featuring Dan Wilson
1999 Friends Again Soundtrack – Semisonic's "Delicious" 
1999 10 Things I Hate About You Soundtrack – Semisonic's "FNT"
1999 Never Been Kissed Soundtrack – Semisonic's "Never You Mind" 
1999 For the Love of the Game Soundtrack – Semisonic's "For the Love of the Game" 
1996 The Long Kiss Goodnight Soundtrack – Semisonic's "FNT"

Film and Soundtracks (as a writer and producer)
2019 Big Little Lies (TV series) Season 2 Soundtrack – "That Was Yesterday" (Leon Bridges)
2014 The Fault In Our Stars Soundtrack – "Tee Shirt" and "Best Shot" (Birdy)
2013 Spark: A Burning Man Story Soundtrack – "We Ride" (Missy Higgins)
2013 Safe Haven Soundtrack – "We Both Know" (Colbie Caillat & Gavin DeGraw)
2010 The Twilight Saga: Eclipse Soundtrack – "Ours" (The Bravery)
2010 The Kid Soundtrack'' – "Boy" (KT Tunstall)

Writing and producing credits

References

External links

Official website
Full discography 
Writing and producing credits
DW's Sketchbook

1961 births
Living people
Musicians from Minneapolis
American session musicians
American rock guitarists
American male guitarists
American rock songwriters
American rock singers
Grammy Award winners
American country songwriters
MCA Records artists
Harvard College alumni
Record producers from Minnesota
Singer-songwriters from Minnesota
Guitarists from Minnesota
Semisonic members
Trip Shakespeare members
20th-century American guitarists
20th-century American male musicians
American male singer-songwriters